The 1924 Washington gubernatorial election was held on November 4, 1924. Republican nominee Roland H. Hartley defeated Democratic nominee Ben F. Hill with 56.41% of the vote.

Primary elections
Primary elections were held on September 9, 1924.

Democratic primary

Candidates 
Ben F. Hill, Mayor of Walla Walla
Walter J. Robinson
Edward T. Mathes
E.F. Blaine

Results

Republican primary

Candidates
Roland H. Hartley, former State Representative and former mayor of Everett
E. L. French
Edward Clifford
W. H. Paulhamus, former State Senator
George B. Lamping, State Senator
William J. Coyle
Thomas P. Revelle
Peter Iverson
Frank Pierce
James Townsend Fullerton

Results

General election

Candidates
Major party candidates
Roland H. Hartley, Republican 
Ben F. Hill, Democratic

Other candidates
J.R. Oman, Farmer–Labor 
William A. Gilmore, Independent
Emil Herman, Socialist
David Burgess, Socialist Labor

Results

References

1924
Washington
Gubernatorial